Endearing Records is a Canadian independent record label established in 1994, now based in Vancouver, British Columbia, originally based in Winnipeg, Manitoba, Canada. Endearing Records has released many albums by Canadian indie artists since the mid 1990s, such as Destroyer, The Meligrove Band, Julie Doiron, The Heavy Blinkers, The Waking Eyes, Paper Moon and Aaron Booth. In 2005, the company started up a separate publishing company, Endearing Publishing which represents the Endearing Records catalogue along with a number of labels such as Vinyl Republik, Saved By Radio, Balanced Records, Bacteria Buffet Records, Submerged Records, Elefant Records, weework and others.

Bands

 The Caribbean
 Destroyer
 Julie Doiron
 The Heavy Blinkers
 The Meligrove Band
 Painted Thin
 Paper Moon
 Parkas
 The Pets
 Plumtree
 The Waking Eyes
 The Bonaduces

See also
 List of record labels

External links
 

Record labels established in 1994
Canadian independent record labels
Indie rock record labels